Electronic resource management (ERM) is the practices and techniques used by librarians and library staff to track the selection, acquisition, licensing, access, maintenance, usage, evaluation, retention, and de-selection of a library's electronic information resources. These resources include, but are not limited to, electronic journals, electronic books, streaming media, databases, datasets, CD-ROMs, and computer software.

History
Following the advent of the Digital Revolution, libraries began incorporating electronic information resources into their collections and services. The inclusion of these resources was driven by the core values of library science, as expressed by Raganathan's five laws of library science, especially the belief that electronic technologies made access to information more direct, convenient, and timely. By the end of 1990s, however, it became clear that the techniques used by librarians to manage physical resources did not transfer well to the electronic medium. In January 2000, the Digital Library Federation (DLF) conducted an informal survey aimed at identifying the major challenges facing research libraries regarding their use of information technologies. The survey revealed that digital collection development was considered the greatest source of anxiety and uncertainty among librarians, and that knowledge regarding the handling of electronic resources was rarely shared outside individual libraries. As a result, the Digital Library Federation created the Collection Practices Initiative and commissioned three reports with the goal of documenting effective practices in electronic resource management.

In his 2001 report entitled Selection and Presentation of Commercially Available Electronic Resources, Timothy Jewell of the University of Washington discussed the home-grown and ad hoc management techniques academic libraries were employing to handle the acquisition, licensing, and activation of electronic resources. He concluded that "existing library management systems and software lack important features and functionality" to track electronic resources and that "coordinated efforts to define needs and establish standards may prove to be of broad benefit."

Writing in The Scholarly Kitchen in 2019, Joseph Esposito noted that in a meeting with the heads of a number of academic libraries of various sizes, there was unanimous expression of frustration with electronic resource management systems.

Data analysis
In the 2020s, libraries have expanded the usage of open source data analysis tools like the non-profit Unpaywall Journals which combines several methods to help librarians analyze data that can be used to select electronic resources.

See also
ERAMS (e-resource access and management services)
OpenURL knowledge base
UKSG E-Resources Management Handbook

References

Library management
Library automation